"Ghostdancing" is a song written by Jim Kerr, Charlie Burchill and Mick MacNeil and recorded by Scottish rock band Simple Minds. It was released as the fourth single from the band's 1985 album Once Upon a Time. According to the band's website, the first live performance of the song was at John F. Kennedy Stadium as part of their Live Aid performance. The song also appears on their "Glittering Prize (81-92)" album. The song reached number 13 in the UK singles charts.

References

External links
 "Ghost Dancing" from AllMusic

1985 singles
1985 songs
Simple Minds songs
Songs written by Jim Kerr
Songs written by Charlie Burchill
Songs written by Mick MacNeil
Virgin Records singles